Tales of The Kama Sutra: The Perfumed Garden is an 2000 Indo-American drama film directed by Jag Mundhra, with original soundtrack by Tor Hyams. The film takes its title from the ancient Indian text the Kama Sutra.

Plot
When an American couple Michael and Lisa travel to India to restore an erotic sex goddess sculpture in Rajasthan, they are immediately acquainted with the Vatsayana Kama Sutra in a fictional set up of Kamasutra school. The couple are taught the skills of seduction by Abhisarika a Royal Kamasutra expert. When forbidden desires are revealed, vows are broken leading to infidelity.

See also
 Kama Sutra: A Tale of Love
 Tales of The Kama Sutra 2: Monsoon
Kamasutra 3D
Kamasutra Nights: Maya

References

External links
 

2000 films
Films set in India
Films set in ancient India
English-language Indian films
Films by Desi directors
American erotic drama films
Films based on the Kama Sutra
2000s English-language films
Films directed by Jag Mundhra
2000s American films